Herpes virus may refer to:

 Any member of the large family of DNA viruses known as Herpesviridae
 Human herpesviruses, nine types of herpesviruses that can cause diseases in humans
 Herpes simplex virus 1 and 2, responsible for herpes simplex infections
 Human alphaherpesvirus 3, also called varicella-zoster virus, responsible for chickenpox and shingles
 Human gammaherpesvirus 4, or Epstein–Barr virus, one of the most common viruses which can cause various diseases
 Human betaherpesvirus 5
 Roseolovirus, a genus that includes three human herpesviruses:
 Human herpesvirus 6, the collective name for Human betaherpesvirus 6A and Human betaherpesvirus 6B
 Human betaherpesvirus 7
 Human gammaherpesvirus 8, or Kaposi's sarcoma-associated herpesvirus

See also
 Herpes simplex, any infection caused by Herpes simplex virus 1 or 2
 Herpes labialis, also called cold sores, painful blistering of the lip
 Genital herpes, a sexually transmitted infection
 :Category:Herpes simplex virus–associated diseases, overview of diseases associated with a Herpes simplex virus